Friedrich Christian Bressand (c.1670 – 11 April 1699) was a Baroque German poet and opera librettist.

Life
Bressand was born in Durlach. His brief life was spent predominantly in the service of German courts. He was born the son of the Margrave of Durlach's personal cook, but was forced to flee the town when it was destroyed by French troops in 1689. The house stood until 1861.

The Duke himself wrote opera librettos and enlisted Bressand to assist him in the organization of theatrical events. They started with German arrangements of French and Italian operas and Bressand soon fashioned a significant number of his own librettos, which evidently became popular with composers, given the number of composers who set his texts. His texts were even performed at the richly-furnished Hamburg opera, the Oper am Gänsemarkt, alongside those of such poets as Christian Heinrich Postel (1658–1705). After ten years of productive work, he died suddenly in Wolfenbüttel at the age of 29.

Bibliography
 Gerhard Dünnhaupt: "Friedrich Christian Bressand (1670?–1699)", in: Personalbibliographien zu den Drucken des Barock, vol. 2. Hiersemann, Stuttgart 1990, pp. 795–815. 
 Helmut Degen: Friedrich Christian Bressand. Dissertation. Rostock 1934
 Gustav Friedrich Schmidt: Neue Beiträge zur Geschichte der Musik und des Theaters am Herzoglichen Hofe zu Braunschweig-Wolfenbüttel. Munich 1929
 Sara Smart: Doppelte Freude der Musen. Wiesbaden 1990
 

1670 births
1699 deaths
Writers from Karlsruhe
German opera librettists
German poets
German male poets
German male dramatists and playwrights
17th-century German dramatists and playwrights
17th-century German male writers